The 1999 NCAA Men's Water Polo Championship was the 31st annual NCAA Men's Water Polo Championship to determine the national champion of NCAA men's collegiate water polo. Tournament matches were played at Canyonview Pool in La Jolla, San Diego, California during December 1999.

UCLA defeated Stanford in the final, 6–5, to win their sixth national title. The Bruins (22–3) were coached by Guy Baker and Adam Krikorian.

The Most Outstanding Player of the tournament was Sean Kern from UCLA. Kern, along with seven other players, comprised the All-Tournament Team. 

Kern was also the tournament's leading scorer, with 8 goals.

Qualification
Since there has only ever been one single national championship for water polo, all NCAA men's water polo programs (whether from Division I, Division II, or Division III) were eligible. A total of 4 teams were invited to contest this championship.

Bracket
Site: Canyonview Pool, La Jolla, San Diego, California

All-tournament team 
Matt Armato, UCLA
Nick Ellis, Stanford
Brian Heifferon, Stanford
Pat Kain, Massachusetts
Sean Kern, UCLA (Most outstanding player)
Ross Mecham, UC San Diego
Jonathan Samuels, UC San Diego
Jonathan Skaalen, Stanford

See also 
 NCAA Men's Water Polo Championship

References

NCAA Men's Water Polo Championship
NCAA Men's Water Polo Championship
NCAA Men's Water Polo Championship
December 1999 sports events in the United States
1990
Water Polo Championship